Verkhotursky (masculine), Verkhoturskaya (feminine), or Verkhoturskoye (neuter) may refer to:
Verkhotursky District, a district of Sverdlovsk Oblast, Russia
Verkhotursky Urban Okrug, the municipal formation, which the district is incorporated as
Verkhotursky Uyezd, an administrative division (an uyezd) of Perm Governorate, Russian Empire and later Russian SFSR